Siegel v. Fitzgerald, 596 U.S. ___ (2022), was a United States Supreme Court case related to the United States bankruptcy courts.

Background 

Congress created the United States Trustee Program in the 1980s to transfer administrative functions of the bankruptcy courts to the executive branch. When it did so, Alabama and North Carolina were provided exemptions, remaining under the bankruptcy administrator program instead. Chapter 11 debtors in Trustee Program courts pay quarterly fees throughout the duration of their case, while debtors in administrator states were exempt until 2001, when the Judicial Conference of the United States issued a standing order making the fees the same rates in both systems. In 2017, the Trustee Fund faced a shortfall in funds, so Congress passed the Bankruptcy Judgeship Act of 2017, increasing fees dramatically in Trustee Program districts. The Judicial Conference extended the hike to administrator program districts, but only for new cases. Circuit City filed for bankruptcy in 2008, in a Trustee Program district, and saw its fees dramatically increase due to the hike. It challenged the increase as violating the uniformity requirement of the United States Constitution's Bankruptcy Clause. The bankruptcy court agreed, but the United States Court of Appeals for the Fourth Circuit reversed, over the dissent of Judge A. Marvin Quattlebaum Jr.

Supreme Court 

Certiorari was granted in the case on January 10, 2022. Oral arguments were held on April 18, 2022. On June 6, 2022, the Supreme Court issued a unanimous opinion reversing the Fourth Circuit as to the constitutionality of the fee increase, while remanding for consideration of what the remedy should be.

References

External links 
 

2022 in United States case law
United States Supreme Court cases
United States Supreme Court cases of the Roberts Court
United States bankruptcy case law